Krasny Yar is a rural locality (a selo) in Kabansky District, Republic of Buryatia, Russia. The population was 378 as of 2010. There are 19 streets.

Geography 
Krasny Yar is located 54 km north of Kabansk (the district's administrative centre) by road. Novaya Derevnya is the nearest rural locality.

References 

Rural localities in Kabansky District